

155001–155100 

|-id=083
| 155083 Banneker ||  || Benjamin Banneker (1731–1806), freeborn African-American farmer, clockmaker, writer and scientist || 
|}

155101–155200 

|-id=116
| 155116 Verkhivnya ||  || Verkhivnya, a small Ukrainian village, where French novelist Honoré de Balzac wrote La Marâtre, Les Paysans and part of La Comédie humaine at the estate of his wife, countess Evelina Hańska || 
|-id=138
| 155138 Pucinskas ||  || Aloyzas Pucinskas (born 1933), associate professor at the Astronomical Observatory of Vilnius University || 
|-id=142
| 155142 Tenagra ||  || Tenagra, mythical island mentioned ("Darmok and Jalad at Tenagra") in the Darmok episode of Star Trek - The Next Generation, and the namesake of the discovering Tenagra II Observatory || 
|}

155201–155300 

|-id=215
| 155215 Vámostibor ||  || Tibor Vámos (born 1926) is an electrical engineer, full member of the Hungarian Academy of Sciences, and the father of data communication in Hungary. He was the winner of the 2005 annual science communication award of the Club of Hungarian Science Journalists. || 
|-id=270
| 155270 Dianawheeler ||  || Diana E. Wheeler (born 1950) made fundamental contributions to understanding the physiological basis of caste determination in social insects. Her research blazed the trail for uncovering the relationship between environmental factors and physiology and the evolution of eusociality which is at the core for gene-environment interactions. || 
|-id=290
| 155290 Anniegrauer ||  || Patricia Ann ("Annie") Purnell Grauer (born 1942), American photographer, cook, homemaker, writer and a student of the night sky || 
|}

155301–155400 

|-bgcolor=#f2f2f2
| colspan=4 align=center | 
|}

155401–155500 

|-id=438
| 155438 Velásquez || 1998 DV || Diego Velázquez (1599–1660), Spanish painter of the Spanish Golden Age || 
|}

155501–155600 

|-bgcolor=#f2f2f2
| colspan=4 align=center | 
|}

155601–155700 

|-bgcolor=#f2f2f2
| colspan=4 align=center | 
|}

155701–155800 

|-id=784
| 155784 Ercol ||  || Carl Jack Ercol (born 1959) is a systems engineer at the Applied Physics Laboratory. He served as the Thermal Subsystem Lead for the New Horizons mission to Pluto. || 
|}

155801–155900 

|-bgcolor=#f2f2f2
| colspan=4 align=center | 
|}

155901–156000 

|-id=948
| 155948 Maquet ||  || Lucie Maquet (born 1985), French astronomer who researches cometary non-gravitational forces at IMCCE in Paris, and observer at the Pic du Midi Observatory || 
|}

References 

155001-156000